Heshniz (also Romanized as Heshnīz and Hashnīz; also known as Eshnīz, Hashinaz, and Heshīnaz) is a village in Buchir Rural District, in the Central District of Parsian County, Hormozgan Province, Iran. At the 2006 census, its population was 670, in 149 families.

References 

Populated places in Parsian County